Abrishami may refer to:

Abrishami Synagogue, synagogue in Tehran, Iran
Hessam Abrishami (born 1951), Iranian artist